The 2010 Prix de l'Arc de Triomphe was a horse race held at Longchamp on Sunday 3 October 2010. It was the 89th running of the Prix de l'Arc de Triomphe.

The winner was Workforce, a three-year-old colt trained in Great Britain by Sir Michael Stoute. The winning jockey was Ryan Moore.

Workforce had previously won the Epsom Derby, but had finished only fifth in the King George VI and Queen Elizabeth Stakes. The decision to run in the "Arc" had not been confirmed until three days before the race.

Race details
 Sponsor: Qatar Racing and Equestrian Club
 Purse: €4,000,000; First prize: €2,285,600 
 Going: Very Soft
 Distance: 2,400 metres
 Number of runners: 19
 Winner's time: 2m 35.3s

Full result

 Abbreviations: nse = nose; hd = head

Winner's details
Further details of the winner, Workforce.
 Sex: Colt
 Foaled: 14 March 2007
 Country: Great Britain
 Sire: King's Best; Dam: Soviet Moon (Sadler's Wells)
 Owner: Khalid Abdullah
 Breeder: Juddmonte Farms

References

External links
 Colour Chart – Arc 2010

Prix de l'Arc de Triomphe
 2010
2010 in French sport
2010 in Paris
October 2010 sports events in France